Viševice is/was a settlement in the Bosnia and Herzegovina, Republika Srpska entity, Kotor Varoš Municipality.

In  Census Year 2013, in this village only 5 inhabitants were registered.

Population

See also
Kotor Varoš

References

Villages in Bosnia and Herzegovina
Populated places in Kotor Varoš